Pick a Pint was an Australian television series which aired in 1960 on Melbourne station HSV-7. It was a game show for children and was hosted by Pat Hodgins. A 15-minute series broadcast on Fridays, it proved short-lived, running from February to May. The archival status of the series is not known.

Hodgins had previously hosted Snakes and Ladders on the same station.

References

External links
 

Seven Network original programming
1960 Australian television series debuts
1960 Australian television series endings
Black-and-white Australian television shows
English-language television shows
1960s Australian game shows